Spontaneous Combustion is an album by progressive metal group Liquid Trio Experiment, and is the result of the studio improvisations of Liquid Tension Experiment which occurred while John Petrucci was with his wife while she was giving birth. The trio of Mike Portnoy, Tony Levin and Jordan Rudess continued to write music during this period. It was released on October 23, 2007. A few songs from Liquid Tension Experiment 2 were spawned from these jam sessions including "914", "Chewbacca", and "Liquid Dreams". The song "Chris & Kevin's Bogus Journey" is not a reference to Portnoy and Petrucci's former Dream Theater bandmates Chris Collins and Kevin Moore, but rather to the track on Liquid Tension Experiment's first album entitled "Chris & Kevin's Excellent Adventure", which is itself a reference to the band's photographer's habit of calling Mike Portnoy and Tony Levin "Chris and Kevin", even after being corrected several times.  It is also a reference to the 1991 film Bill & Ted's Bogus Journey, the sequel to Bill & Ted's Excellent Adventure. The song "Jazz Odyssey" is a reference to the movie This Is Spinal Tap, in which Spinal Tap experiments with an improvisational song of the same name.

While the jams were improvised in 1998, it took until 2007 to release them, as the master tapes of the jams were somehow misplaced before they were delivered to Magna Carta. The recordings on the album (and "the only remaining records of these sessions in existence") were taken from Portnoy's 2-track stereo DAT.

Track listing

Personnel
Jordan Rudess - keyboards
Tony Levin - bass
Mike Portnoy - drums, percussion
Chris Cubeta - engineering
Jim Brick - mastering

References

2007 albums
Liquid Tension Experiment albums
Magna Carta Records albums